Yu Da University of Science and Technology (YDU) is a private university in Zaoqiao Township, Miaoli County, Taiwan.

YDUST offers a range of undergraduate and graduate programs in various fields, including business, engineering, design, tourism, and healthcare. Some of the most popular programs at the university include Information Management, Electronic Engineering, Business Administration, and Industrial Design.

History
YDU was originally established in 1999 as Yu Da College of Business fully funded by Dr. Kwang-Ya Wang and his wife. Dr. Wang was the president of Yu Da High School of Commerce and Home Economics from 1977 to 2010.  In August 2009, the school changed its name to Yu Da University after the approval of Ministry of Education.

Faculties
 College of Management
 College of Leisure and Creativity
 College of Finance and Economics
 College of Humanities and Social Sciences

Transportation
The university is accessible within walking distance South West from Tanwen Station of Taiwan Railways.

See also
 List of universities in Taiwan

References

External links

 

1999 establishments in Taiwan
Educational institutions established in 1999
Private universities and colleges in Taiwan
Universities and colleges in Miaoli County
Universities and colleges in Taiwan
Technical universities and colleges in Taiwan